Promenade MRT station is an underground Mass Rapid Transit (MRT) interchange station on the Downtown (DTL) and Circle (CCL) lines in Downtown Core, Singapore. Located underneath Temasek Avenue and adjacent to Millenia Tower, the station is close to several key attractions and locations such as Suntec City and the Marina Promenade, which the station is named after. The station is at the junction of the Dhoby Ghaut and Marina Bay branches of the CCL.

The station was first announced as Milennia MRT station in 1999 and was part of the Marina Line, which later became CCL Stage 1. It was later announced in 2005 that the CCL would branch off from this station to serve Chinatown, which eventually became DTL Stage 1 in 2007. The station opened on 17 April 2010 as part of the CCL Stages 1 and 2. On 14 January 2012, the CCL branch to Marina Bay via Bayfront station opened. The DTL platforms opened on 22 December 2013 as part of Downtown line Stage 1.

History

Circle line

The station was initially part of the Marina Line, serving between the Dhoby Ghaut and Stadium stations, which was later incorporated into the CCL Stage 1.

In 2005, the station's name was finalised as Promenade, in light of its proximity to the Marina Promenade. Although Sheares garnered the most votes in the station names poll, it was decided that naming the station after the former president Benjamin Sheares was considered too 'prestigious' for one of the many underground MRT stations in Singapore and hence was not named after him. During the station's construction, on 25 March 2003, a section of Rochor Road (from ECP to Suntec City) had to be realigned.

The station opened on 17 April 2010 along with the rest of Stages 1 and 2 of the Circle line. Subsequently, the two-station  extension from Promenade to Marina Bay station opened on 14 January 2012 as announced on 28 November 2011.

Downtown line

On 14 June 2005, the Land Transport Authority announced the  Downtown extension that will branch off the CCL to serve the New Downtown at Marina Bay area. The DTE was later revised to be the first stage of the  Downtown Line (DTL) in 2007.

Portions of Temasek Avenue were realigned during the construction period to allow construction works to be carried out. The construction of the bored tunnels required the use of  diameter Earth pressure balance (EPB) machines. The DTL station commenced operations on 22 December 2013.

Station details

Location
Promenade station is located underneath Temasek Avenue and adjacent to Millenia Tower. The station also serves several key locations and attractions such as Suntec City, Singapore Flyer, The Float@Marina Bay and the Marina Bay Street Circuit. It is also close to the Marina Promenade after which the station is named.

Architecture

The station is designed by DP Architects. The station features a "curvilinear envelope with deep-edged metal louvres" to conceal the concrete service shafts and integrate with the vertically glazed skylights. The three entrances to the station have identical features of thin and sharp lines for the roof and glazed panels for the sides. The interior features a pattern of light grey and granite floors, with granite and stainless steel-trimmed panels on the walls and metal-grid ceilings.

Prior to the Nicoll Highway collapse, it was planned for the station, along with Nicoll Highway station, to have a cross-platform interchange with an unspecified future line; that line had to be realigned as the new Nicoll Highway station did not have provisions for the line. The station also features one of the longest escalators on the MRT network, with the length being .

Art in transit

Two artworks are featured at this station as part of the MRT network's Art-in-Transit Programme. At the CCL platforms, the artwork "Dreams in a Social Cosmic Odyssey" (D.I.S.C.O.) by PHUNK studios features huge metallic droplets suspended from the ceiling, to represent an "illuminated celebration of collective dreams". The droplets reflect the sunlight from above, creating a moving kaleidoscope on the station floors. These waves of light illustrate the "ebb and flow" commuter traffic and allow the interaction of passengers in transit with the art piece.

The four artists – Alvin Tan, Melvin Chee, Jackson Tan and William Chan – decided to make use of the skylight such that the artwork becomes a key feature of the station, instead of creating a mural on the station wall. Initially, it was planned to hang a chandelier made up silhouettes of human figures representing how "People illuminates Life", but was considered by the Art-in-Transit panel as "too literal". Inspired by the station's proximity to the Marina Bay Reservoir and Kallang Basin, the artists decided to use water droplets for the artwork.

At the DTL platforms, an artwork "Earthcake" by Ana Prvacki depicts the multiple layers of Singapore's geology, history, culture, growth and development through the tiers of cultural sediment permeating the area. The artwork, intended to be a "collage of earth and local desserts”, also bears similarity with one of the colourful local kuehs, reflecting Singapore's multi-culturalism centred on food. According to Prvacki, she was inspired by the core samples from the site taken during the station's construction and saw its visual similarities with the local kueh. The DTL artwork has drawn mixed reactions from other artists. Yek Wong, painter of the artwork at one-north station, was critical of the artwork, saying the artwork is "too trapped in philosophical mumbo jumbo". On the other hand, Jason Ong, the artist behind the artwork at HarbourFront, finds the layers and repetition of the artwork appealing and was intrigued by the "conceptual link" between the dessert and the stratification of the ground.

Notes and references

Footnotes

References

External links
 SBS Transit's Promenade MRT station official website
 
 Promenade to Changi Airport MRT station route

Railway stations in Singapore opened in 2010
Downtown Core (Singapore)
Mass Rapid Transit (Singapore) stations